On January 4, 1850, the "central towns" (Vărad - Orașul Nou, Vărad - Olosig, Vărad - Velența și Vărad - Subcetate) were officially united, forming Oradea Mare (Great Oradea). The first designated mayor of the united towns was Bolonyi Menyhert.

Mayors of Oradea

References 
 Gheorghe Gorun, Gabrile Moisa,Tereza Mozes și Liviu Borcea, Istoria orașului Oradea, Editura Arca, 2008
 Fleisz János: Egy város átalakulása. Nagyvárad a két világháború között 1919–1940. Editura Literator, Oradea, 2005.
 Fleisz János: Nagyvárad története évszámokban. Editura Literator, Oradea, 2000.
 Péter I. Zoltán: Nagyvárad 900 éves múltja és épített öröksége. Editura Noran, Budapesta, 2005.

Oradea
Oradea